The Wallace River is a river running mostly through Cumberland County, Nova Scotia, Canada.

See also
 List of rivers of Nova Scotia

References

Rivers of Nova Scotia
Landforms of Cumberland County, Nova Scotia